George Charles Disch (March 15, 1879 – August 25, 1950) was a pitcher in Major League Baseball. He played for the Detroit Tigers in 1905.

References

External links

1879 births
1950 deaths
Major League Baseball pitchers
Detroit Tigers players
Baseball players from Missouri
Sportspeople from Rapid City, South Dakota
Milwaukee Brewers (minor league) players
Marshalltown Grays players
Evansville River Rats players
Freeport Pretzels players
Kosciuszko Reds players